Corynis is a genus of insects belonging to the family Cimbicidae.

The species of this genus are found in Europe and Northern Africa.

Species:
 Corynis obscura (Fabricius, 1775)

References

Cimbicidae
Sawfly genera